Star Wars: The Old Republic: Annihilation is part of the Star Wars expanded universe. Written by Drew Karpyshyn and released on November 13, 2012. This novel is the fourth entry in the Star Wars: The Old Republic novel series. News of the book was released at the Del Rey Star Wars books panel at the 2011 New York Comic-Con. It takes place just after the events of the Star Wars: The Old Republic class stories and focuses on Theron Shan. The paperback edition was released on October 29, 2013, while the UK paperback was released on May 24, 2013.

External links 
 
 Drew Karpyshyn's Website

2012 Canadian novels
2012 science fiction novels
Star Wars: Knights of the Old Republic novels
Star Wars Legends novels
Canadian science fiction novels
Del Rey books